Torgeir Dahl (born 13 December 1953) is a Norwegian politician for the Conservative Party.

He served as a deputy representative to the Parliament of Norway from Møre og Romsdal during the term 2009–2013. He is the mayor of Molde since 2011.

References

1953 births
Living people
People from Molde
Deputy members of the Storting
Conservative Party (Norway) politicians
Mayors of places in Møre og Romsdal
21st-century Norwegian politicians